Patrick Rafter and Sandon Stolle were the defending champions, but Rafter did not compete this year. Stolle teamed up with Wayne Black and lost in the semifinals to Byron Black and Wayne Ferreira.

Byron Black and Ferreira won the title by defeating Goran Ivanišević and Brian MacPhie 6–2, 7–6(7–4) in the final.

Seeds

Draw

Draw

References

External links
 Official results archive (ATP)
 Official results archive (ITF)

Los Angeles Open (tennis)
1999 ATP Tour